Nkandla is a South African place name that may refer to:
 Nkandla, KwaZulu-Natal, a town
 Nkandla Local Municipality, the local authority that includes the town and surrounds
 Nkandla homestead, the homestead of President Jacob Zuma
 Nkandla (genus), a genus of moths in the family Tortricidae